Jonathan Scott Frakes (born August 19, 1952) is an American actor and director. He is best known for his portrayal of Commander William Riker in the television series Star Trek: The Next Generation and subsequent films and series. He has also hosted the anthology series Beyond Belief: Fact or Fiction, voiced David Xanatos in the Disney television series Gargoyles, and narrated the History Channel documentary, Lee and Grant. He is the author of the novel The Abductors: Conspiracy.

Frakes began directing episodes of The Next Generation during its third season, and went on to direct the feature films Star Trek: First Contact (1996) and Star Trek: Insurrection (1998) and episodes of the later Star Trek series Deep Space Nine, Voyager, Discovery, and Picard. He later directed the feature films Clockstoppers (2002) and Thunderbirds (2004). He has since directed prolifically for television, including for the The Librarian television films and series, Roswell, Leverage, and Burn Notice.

Early life
Frakes was born in 1952 in Bellefonte, Pennsylvania, to Doris J. (née Yingling; 1926–2020) and James R. Frakes (1924–2002). Frakes's father was a professor of English literature and American studies at Lehigh University from 1958 to 2001, and was also a reviewer and critic for The New York Times Book Review. Frakes had a younger brother, Daniel, who died in 1997 from pancreatic cancer.

Frakes was raised in Bethlehem, Pennsylvania in the Lehigh Valley region of eastern Pennsylvania. He attended Liberty High School in Bethlehem, where he ran track and played with the Liberty High School Grenadier Band. He graduated from Liberty High School in 1970.

Frakes attended Pennsylvania State University, earning a Bachelor of Fine Arts in Theater Arts in 1974. He was a member of the Thespians. In 1976, he received his Master of Arts from Harvard University and was active in Harvard's acting company, the Loeb Drama Center.

Career

Early work 

For a time in the 1970s, Frakes worked for Marvel Comics, appearing at conventions in costume as Captain America. Frakes moved to New York City and became a member of the Impossible Ragtime Theater. In that company, Frakes did his first off-Broadway acting in Eugene O'Neill's The Hairy Ape directed by George Ferencz. His first Broadway appearance was in Shenandoah. At the same time, he landed a role in the NBC soap opera The Doctors. When his character was dismissed from the show, Frakes moved to Los Angeles and had guest spots in many of the top television series of the 1970s and 1980s, including The Waltons in the episodes "The Legacy" and "The Lost Sheep"; Eight Is Enough; Hart to Hart; The Dukes of Hazzard; Matlock; Quincy, M.E. in "The Face of Fear"; and Hill Street Blues.

He played the part of Charles Lindbergh in a 1983 episode of Voyagers! titled "An Arrow Pointing East". In 1983, he had a role in the short-lived NBC prime time soap opera Bare Essence (which also starred his future wife Genie Francis), and a supporting role in the equally short-lived primetime soap Paper Dolls in 1984. He also had recurring roles in Falcon Crest and the miniseries North and South. Frakes appeared in the 1986 miniseries Dream West.

Star Trek: The Next Generation (1987) 

In 1987, Frakes was cast in the role of Commander William T. Riker on Star Trek: The Next Generation. He was one of only two actors to appear in every episode (the other being Patrick Stewart). While appearing on the show, Frakes was allowed to sit in on casting sessions, concept meetings, production design, editing, and post-production, which gave him the preparation he needed to become a director. He directed eight episodes of the show and 21 episodes of the Star Trek universe. After the TV series ended in 1994, Frakes reprised his role in the Star Trek: The Next Generation films, two of which (Star Trek: First Contact and Star Trek: Insurrection) he directed.

Frakes has made appearances in Star Trek: Deep Space Nine, Star Trek: Voyager, Star Trek: Enterprise, Star Trek: Picard and Star Trek: Lower Decks, making him the only Star Trek regular to appear in six Star Trek series. He has also directed episodes in five of the series (TNG, DS9, VOY, DIS and PIC). Frakes is also one of six Star Trek actors (the other actors being Kate Mulgrew, Michael Dorn, George Takei, Avery Brooks and Majel Barrett) to lend their voices to the video game Star Trek: Captain's Chair, reprising his role as Riker when users visit the Enterprise-E bridge featured in the game.

After Star Trek 

Wanting to branch out from the Star Trek franchise, Frakes turned down the opportunity to direct Star Trek: Nemesis to direct the family film Clockstoppers. However, his next film, Thunderbirds, was a box-office bomb which he has said single-handedly almost destroyed what had been a successful directing career: "[My] name was taken off the lists ... I went from 60 to zero. It was a wake-up for me. I had been so positive, and so blessed, and so fortunate." It was several years before Frakes was given another opportunity to direct for television, and Thunderbirds remains his last theatrical directorial credit.

Much of Frakes' acting work after Star Trek has been animation voice acting, most notably voicing the recurring role of David Xanatos in the animated series Gargoyles, and he provided the voice of his own head in a jar in the Futurama episode "Where No Fan Has Gone Before". He had a small, uncredited role in the 1994 film Camp Nowhere. Frakes also voiced Finn the Human's adult version in the episodes "Puhoy" and "Dungeon Train" on Adventure Time.

Frakes was an executive producer for the WB series Roswell, directed several episodes, and guest-starred in three episodes. His relationship with Star Trek is downplayed in the season 3 episode "Secrets and Lies", in which the alien character Max auditions for a guest role as an alien for Star Trek: Enterprise.

Frakes appeared on the 1994 Phish album Hoist, playing trombone on the track titled "Riker's Mailbox". Frakes would occasionally perform on the trombone during his tenure as Commander Riker, drawing on his college marching band experience. He was also a member of "The Sunspots", a vocal backup group of Star Trek cast members that appeared on Brent Spiner's 1991 album Ol' Yellow Eyes Is Back.

Frakes hosted The Paranormal Borderline, a short-lived television series on UPN, which dealt with the paranormal and mysterious happenings and creatures. In one episode, Frakes presented an interview of reporter Yolanda Gaskins with veteran astronaut Gordon Cooper, where they discussed the possibility of aliens having visited Earth in the past. He hosted seasons 2 through 4 of Beyond Belief: Fact or Fiction, which also dealt with the paranormal world.

Frakes and Francis appeared together in Lois & Clark in the episode "Don't Tug on Superman's Cape" as a creepily too-good-to-be-true couple. He narrated the History Channel's That's Impossible.

In addition to Roswell, Frakes has directed episodes of Leverage, Castle, NCIS: Los Angeles, Burn Notice, Falling Skies and most recently Marvel's Agents of S.H.I.E.L.D., Switched at Birth, Hit the Floor, The Librarians, and The Orville.

Frakes works with the Workshops, the Waterfall Arts Center, and the Saltwater Film Society, all located in Maine, where he teaches classes on film direction. He has also previously taught directing and filmmaking courses at Rockport College, now called Maine Media College. He and Francis owned a home furnishings store in Belfast, Maine, called The Cherished Home, which closed in August 2012 due to her being too busy with her acting to spend adequate time at the store.

Personal life
Frakes first met actress Genie Francis on the set of the television soap opera Bare Essence, and again while filming the mini-series North and South. They began dating in 1985, became engaged in 1986, and married on May 28, 1988. The couple have two children, Jameson Ivor Frakes, born in 1994, and Elizabeth Frances Frakes, born in 1997. They moved from Belfast, Maine, to Beverly Hills, California, in 2008 and later moved to Calabasas, California.

Filmography

Acting credits

Directing credits

References

External links

 
 
 
 
 Jonathan Frakes in-depth interview at 

1952 births
Living people
20th-century American male actors
21st-century American male actors
American people of English descent
American people of German descent
American male film actors
American male television actors
American male voice actors
American television directors
Harvard University alumni
Liberty High School (Bethlehem, Pennsylvania) alumni
Male actors from Pennsylvania
Penn State College of Arts and Architecture alumni
People from Belfast, Maine
Science fiction film directors
Writers from Bethlehem, Pennsylvania
Film directors from Pennsylvania
Film directors from Maine
Audiobook narrators